The 1960 Philadelphia Eagles season was the franchise's 28th season in the National Football League, and finished with the Eagles' win over the Green Bay Packers in the NFL championship game to get their third league title. The victory over the Packers was also the first and only playoff defeat of the Packers' Vince Lombardi's coaching career. The 1960 season was the Eagles' first postseason appearance since their last NFL championship season of 1949. It was their only postseason appearance in the 28 seasons from 1950 to 1977, and their last NFL title until their victory in Super Bowl LII, 57 years later.

Off Season 
On March 13, 1960, there was an expansion draft to stock the Dallas Rangers, who soon changed their name to the "Cowboys." In this draft the Eagles lost tight end Dick Bielski, tackle Jerry DeLucca, and linebacker Bill Striegel to Dallas.

As since 1951, the Eagles held training camp at Hersheypark Stadium in Hershey, Pennsylvania.

NFL Draft 
The 1960 NFL draft and the 1960 AFL Draft were held separately for college players (the common draft was initiated in 1967).
The NFL Draft was a draft of 20 rounds with 12 teams picking. The Eagles would rotate having the 7th, 8th or 9th pick in the draft rounds, with Chicago and Cleveland. The quickly assembled NFL franchise of the Dallas Cowboys did not have a chance to pick, as the draft was held on November 30, 1959, before they were formed, January 28, 1960.

The AFL draft was a list made the teams of territorial players they claimed first. Then a draft was held by drafting players by position instead of any available player. When Minneapolis left league other AFL teams pursued those picks. Oakland got the rights after they joined the league.

The Philadelphia Eagles lost 4 players to the AFL including 1st round pick Ron Burton, a running back out of Northwestern University. A total of 6 NFL 1st round picks in this draft would sign with the AFL this year.

Player selections 

The table shows the Eagles selections and what picks they had that were traded away and the team that ended up with that pick. It is possible the Eagles' pick ended up with this team via another team that the Eagles made a trade with.
Not shown are acquired picks that the Eagles traded away.

Regular season 
During the 1960 season, Chuck Bednarik is perhaps best known for knocking Frank Gifford of the New York Giants out of football for over eighteen months, considered one of the most famous tackles in NFL history. It occurred late in the game at Yankee Stadium on November 20.

Bednarik was the last player to play the whole game. He averaged 58 minutes a game, starting at center and linebacker in the second half of season.

Schedule 

 Friday night (September 30)

Game summaries

Week 1

Week 2

Week 3

Week 4

Week 5

Week 7

Week 8

Week 9: at New York Giants

Week 10: vs. New York Giants

Week 11

Week 12

Week 13

Playoffs

NFL Championship

Standings

Results

NFL Championship

Personnel

Postseason 
Soon after the championship game against Green Bay, 61-year-old Buck Shaw retired as head coach of the Eagles. Quarterback and 12-year veteran Norm Van Brocklin retired after the game also and expected to be named head coach, but assistant coach Nick Skorich was promoted; he led the Eagles for the next three years, through the 1963 season.

Van Brocklin, age 34, was named head coach of the expansion Minnesota Vikings in January 1961.
In the 1961 expansion draft the Eagles lost guard Gerry Huth, defensive back Gene Johnson, and center Bill Lapham to Minnesota.

Awards and honors 
1960 Pro Bowl Players:

 League Leaders
 Norm Van Brocklin finishes 2nd to Johnny Unitas in Passing Attempts, Completions, Yards, and TDs
 Norm Van Brocklin finishes 2nd to Milt Plum in Yards per Attempt and Passer Rating
 Ted Dean leads league in KO Returns and 2nd in Punt Returns

Other Awards
 Chuck Bednarik, All-Pro Selection
 Norm Van Brocklin, Bert Bell Award
 AP NFL MVP – Norm Van Brocklin
 UPI MVP – Norm Van Brocklin

References

External links
 Eagles on Pro Football Reference
 Eagles on jt-sw.com

National Football League championship seasons
Philadelphia Eagles seasons
Philadelphia Eagles
Philadel